Eden Jean Carson (born 8 August 2001) is a New Zealand cricketer who currently plays for Otago and New Zealand. She plays as a right-arm off break bowler.

Early life
Carson was born on 8 August 2001 in Dunedin.

Domestic career
Carson made her debut for Otago in 2018, against Wellington in the 2018–19 Hallyburton Johnstone Shield. She took her maiden Twenty20 five-wicket haul in 2020, taking 5/18 against Central Hinds. She scored her maiden half-century in 2019, scoring 51 not out against Auckland in the 2019–20 Hallyburton Johnstone Shield. She took her maiden List A five-wicket haul in 2022, taking 5/17 against Wellington in the final of the Hallyburton Johnstone Shield as her side won by 138 runs. She took 31 wickets during the 2021–22 season, ending as the third-highest wicket-taker in the Hallyburton Johnstone Shield and fourth-highest wicket-taker in the 2021–22 Super Smash.

International career
Carson was offered "surprise" central contract by New Zealand Cricket in May 2022, one of six players to be offered their first such contract. She earned her first call-up to the New Zealand side in June 2022, being picked in the squad for the 2022 Commonwealth Games. She made her Twenty20 International debut on 30 July 2022, against South Africa in New Zealand's first match at the Commonwealth Games. She made her One Day International debut on 22 September 2022, against the West Indies, in which she took 3/31 from her 8 overs. At the 2023 ICC Women's T20 World Cup, Carson was ever-present for New Zealand, taking six wickets at an average of 11.33.

References

External links
 
 

2001 births
Living people
Cricketers from Dunedin
New Zealand women cricketers
New Zealand women One Day International cricketers
New Zealand women Twenty20 International cricketers
Otago Sparks cricketers
Cricketers at the 2022 Commonwealth Games
Commonwealth Games bronze medallists for New Zealand
Commonwealth Games medallists in cricket
Medallists at the 2022 Commonwealth Games